"Stay with Me" is a song by English singer Sam Smith from Smith's debut studio album In the Lonely Hour (2014). It was released in the United States on 14 April 2014 and in the United Kingdom on 18 May 2014. "Stay with Me" is a gospel-inspired ballad that details the protagonist pleading with his or her one-night stand not to leave them. The song was written by Smith, James Napier, and William Phillips, with Tom Petty and Jeff Lynne later receiving co-writer credits due to the song's noted melodic similarity to Petty's single "I Won't Back Down".

The song has become Smith's most successful single to date, peaking at number one in the UK Singles Chart (becoming Smith's third chart-topper there, second as a solo artist), topping the charts in Canada and New Zealand, and reaching number two on the US Billboard Hot 100. It has also reached top ten status in over twelve countries worldwide. At the 57th Annual Grammy Awards ceremony, Darkchild's version of "Stay with Me" won two Grammy Awards for Record of the Year and Song of the Year.

Background
In an interview with NME, Smith said that the song was written in a studio in Old Street with James Napier (Jimmy Napes) and William Phillips (also known as "Tourist"). Phillips started playing with three chords on the piano, and Napier quickly provided a drum pattern, and according to Smith, "the song just flowed out of us so naturally," and the song was written in thirty to forty minutes.  After finishing the song, Smith started to layer their vocals about twenty times, singing in different parts of the studio and harmonizing. The result sounded like a gospel choir, but all from Smith's own voice, and this demo was then used in the released song.

According to Smith, "the song is about the moment in the morning after a one night stand, where the person you are with leaves your house, and you are left by yourself, and it's just a second, where you are just like: 'I wish, I wish'. You don't even love them, you don't really fancy them that much, it's just nice to have someone in the bed next to you." The song won the Grammy Awards for Record of the Year and Song of the Year, and in their acceptance speech for winning the Record of the Year, Smith said that "I want to thank the man who this record is about who I fell in love with last year. Thank you so much for breaking my heart because you got me four Grammys."
 
On 25 March 2014, the song was played for the first time on Zane Lowe's BBC Radio 1 show at 7.30 pm. On 29 March, they performed the song live on NBC's Saturday Night Live in the U.S. On 16 May, they performed the song on The Graham Norton Show. In June, they returned to the U.S. as part of their tour where they performed the song on Good Morning America, at the Apollo Theater in New York with Mary J. Blige, and David Letterman.

Agreement with Tom Petty and Jeff Lynne

In January 2015, it was revealed that a settlement had been reached with Tom Petty's publishing company to add Petty and Jeff Lynne as co-writers, and that they would receive a 12.5% songwriting credit. Petty's publisher contacted Smith's team after it noticed a likeness between "Stay with Me" and the melody of Petty's 1989 song "I Won't Back Down". Petty clarified that he did not believe Smith intentionally plagiarized him, saying "All my years of songwriting have shown me these things can happen. Most times, you catch it before it gets out the studio door, but in this case, it got by. Sam's people were very understanding of our predicament and we easily came to an agreement." According to Smith, they had never heard "I Won't Back Down" before writing "Stay with Me", but they acknowledged the similarity after listening to the song, and said that the likeness was "a complete coincidence". Petty and Lynne, however, were not eligible for a Grammy as the Recording Academy considered "Stay with Me" to have been interpolated from "I Won't Back Down" by Napier, Phillips and Smith; instead Petty and Lynne would be given certificates to honor their contribution to the work, as is usual for writers of sampled or interpolated work.

Composition

In music notation, "Stay with Me" is written in the key of C major; an accidental-free key signature with chord progressions of Am7–F–C, that are persistent throughout the entire song. The song is composed in common (4/4) time signature, and played at a tempo of 84 beats per minute (bpm), all according to the sheet music published at Musicnotes.com by Sony/ATV Music Publishing.

"Stay with Me" was written by Smith, James Napier, William Phillips, with additional credits to Tom Petty and Jeff Lynne. According to Erine Keane of Salon, "Stay with Me" combines a "contemporary drumbeat", blue-eyed soul singing, and a refrain sung in a gospel style, while Stereogum's Tom Breihan called it "a soft-focus piano-soul ballad".

Critical reception
"Stay with Me" received generally positive reviews from music critics. Amy Davidson from Digital Spy called the song an "emotional crescendo" and said the chorus was "slightly over-sentimental" and felt that their "soulful voice" made the singer left in "defeat by fleeting fling". She gave the song four out of five stars. Joe Gross from Rolling Stone gave the song a mixed review, awarding it three of five stars. Isabel Pearson of Nouse gave the song a positive review during her album review, calling the song a "euphoric, slow building love-song that's raw and undeniably one of the best tracks on this album." Sarah Milton of The Upcoming lauded the song, calling it "electrifying with its blunt honesty and exquisite gospel influence."

In July 2014,  Billboard listed "Stay with Me" as one of the "10 Best Songs of 2014 (so far)" saying that the song is "a fragile ballad that finds its backbone when a gospel choir assists the British singer on the harrowing chorus." Variance Magazine named the song its 2014 Song of Summer. The song was placed at number twelve on Rolling Stones 50 Best Songs of 2014 list. In January 2015, "Stay with Me" was ranked at number 15 on The Village Voices annual year-end Pazz & Jop critics' poll.

Commercial performance
In the UK Singles Chart it debuted at number one, making it Smith's third number one. The song became the eighth best-selling song of 2014 in the UK, and the seventh overall when streaming is included. On the Billboard Hot 100, the song peaked at number two for two weeks, making it Smith's first top ten song in the US as a lead artist and their second-highest charting single after "Unholy" (2022). It was held off from the top spot by MAGIC!'s "Rude." As of the week of 2 May 2015, "Stay with Me" has spent 21 weeks in the top ten and 54 weeks on the Hot 100. The song was the tenth best-selling song of 2014 in the United States with 3.34 million copies sold in that year. As of June 2015, The song has sold 4.1 million copies in the US. In Canada, "Stay with Me" topped the Canadian Hot 100 for seven consecutive weeks. In Australia, the song debuted at number 22 on the ARIA Singles Chart on the chart dated 5 May 2014 and later peaked at number five on the chart date 16 June 2014. The song also reached top 10 status in over twelve countries worldwide, becoming Smith's most successful single to date.

Music video
A music video to accompany the release of "Stay with Me" was first released onto YouTube on 27 March 2014 at a total length of three minutes and twenty-nine seconds. The video shows Smith coming out of a house and walking down a street in De Beauvoir Town, London, sitting in a room performing the song, and performing the song in a church with a choir. It was directed by Jamie Thraves. "Stay with Me" received nominations at the MTV Video Music Awards for Best Male Video and Artist to Watch. As of September 2019, the video has received over 1.0 billion views.

Cover versions
In June 2014, Ed Sheeran covered "Stay with Me" at BBC Radio 1's Live Lounge. He explained his choice saying "It's my favourite song of the last year. I think it's an instant classic." Florence and the Machine covered it at the Orange Warsaw Festival. In July, Vin Diesel sang it during an interview with Capital FM. In August, Chris Brown posted a video on Instagram in which he sings the song with lyric changes. Eventual winner Josh Kaufman covered the song for his top 12 performance on the sixth season of The Voice US. Reigan Derry performed the song for "Top 10 Hits" themed week on the sixth series of The X Factor Australia, and her performance debuted at number 20 on the ARIA Singles Chart. In September 2014, FKA twigs also covered it at BBC Radio 1's Live Lounge. Also in September, Charli XCX covered it at Live 95.5's Bing Lounge. Luke James also covered the song, which appeared on his 2014 self-titled album. Kelly Clarkson covered the song at her free concert in honor of the new Microsoft store at the SouthPark Mall in Charlotte, North Carolina. Singer Patti LaBelle performed it in November 2014 on her concert tour. Romain Virgo did a reggae cover. In September 2017, Pink covered "Stay with Me" at BBC Radio 1's Live Lounge.

In November 2017, US country singer Coffey Anderson released it as part of his Sad Love Songs series accompanied by a music video directed by Terry W.

The song is sampled in the track "Freak" from Avicii's posthumous album Tim, which it was released on 6 June 2019.

In 2018, American R&B group The Temptations covered the song in their 2018 album, "All The Time". English folk group Bear’s Den covered the song for the Sunday Sessions.

Live performances
Smith debuted the song live as the musical guest on Saturday Night Live on 29 March 2014.
Smith performed the song at the 2014 MTV Video Music Awards on 24 August 2014 at The Forum in Inglewood, California.
US R&B artist Mary J. Blige performed alongside Smith in a live version of the song also in Los Angeles at the 57th Annual Grammy Awards. Blige provided her vocals in the second verse in place of Smith. The performance is on the artist's Vevo channel.

Media usage 

The song is featured in the television series Mistresses, Girlfriends' Guide to Divorce, Bad Education, and The Mindy Project.

Actor Marlon Wayans lip-synced this song on Spike's Lip Sync Battle.

The song is played in the emotional scene where Mary, Queen of Scots (Adelaide Kane) and a dying Francis II of France (Toby Regbo) dance together in the television series Reign.

In the 2016 animated film Sing, Johnny (voiced by Taron Egerton) sings this song as his audition for the singing competition.

The song is also used as the background music for the Inspiron 17 5000 commercial, with Liev Schreiber and Chris Pratt.

Formats and track listings

CD single
"Stay with Me" – 2:52
"Stay with Me" (Radio Mix) – 2:53

Digital download (Darkchild Version)
"Stay with Me" (Darkchild Version) featuring Mary J. Blige – 2:53
"Stay with Me" (Darkchild Version) – 2:54

Digital download (EP)
"Stay with Me"(Soul Clap Mix) – 5:02
"Stay with Me" (Darkchild Version) – 2:54
"Stay with Me" (Shy FX Remix) – 3:32
"Stay with Me" (Wilfred Giroux Remix) – 4:39

Rainer + Grimm Remix single

"Stay with Me" (Rainer + Grimm Remix) – 3:34

Charts

Weekly charts

Year-end charts

Decade-end charts

Certifications and sales

|-

Release history

See also
 List of best-selling singles in Australia
 List of number-one singles of 2014 (South Africa)
 List of Billboard Adult Contemporary number ones of 2014

References

2013 songs
2014 singles
Sam Smith (singer) songs
Pop ballads
2010s ballads
Soul ballads
Capitol Records singles
UK Singles Chart number-one singles
Irish Singles Chart number-one singles
Canadian Hot 100 number-one singles
Number-one singles in Israel
Number-one singles in New Zealand
Number-one singles in Poland
Number-one singles in Scotland
Contemporary R&B ballads
South African Airplay Chart number-one singles
Songs involved in plagiarism controversies
Grammy Award for Record of the Year
Grammy Award for Song of the Year
Songs written by Jimmy Napes
Songs written by Sam Smith (singer)
Songs written by Tom Petty
Songs written by Jeff Lynne
Songs about casual sex
Songs written by Tourist (musician)